The Théols is a  river in central France.
Its source is at  near Bommiers, in the Boischaut natural region.
It joins the Arnon near Lazenay.

Hydrology 
At this point it drains , over 90% of its watershed.

There are seasonal fluctuations in the flow of the Théols, but they are not substantial. From April, the flow rate decreases regularly toward low water, which lasts from August to October. Floods are seldom important.

Fish 
The river is rich in bleak, barbel, largemouth bass, cream, pike, crucian, roach, gudgeon, rudd, perch, tench, zander and catfish.

References 

Rivers of France
Rivers of Centre-Val de Loire
Rivers of Indre
Rivers of Cher (department)